Natalya Vitalyevna Starovoyt (born February 17, 1962, Omsk, Russia) is a Russian stage actress.

After graduating from Sverdlovsk Theater School in  1984, Starovoyt worked in theaters in Ryazan and Syzran. Since 1988 she has performed with Penza Region Drama Theatre.

Awards
2001: Penza Region Governor's Prize
2004: Merited Artist of the Russian Federation
2011: Certificate of honor of the Legislative Assembly of Penza Region

References

1962 births
Living people
Russian stage actresses
Actors from Omsk
Honored Artists of the Russian Federation